This is a list of notable accidents and incidents involving military aircraft grouped by the year in which the accident or incident occurred. Not all of the aircraft were in operation at the time. For more exhaustive lists, see the Aircraft Crash Record Office, the Air Safety Network or the Dutch Scramble Website Brush and Dustpan Database. Combat losses are not included except for a very few cases denoted by singular circumstances.

2020

January 
2 January
A Sudanese Air Force Antonov An-12A crashes shortly after take-off from Geneina Airport, Khartoum. All eighteen people on board are killed.

2 January

Republic of China Air Force Sikorsky UH-60M Black Hawk 933 strikes a mountainside in Wulai District of northern Taiwan during a VIP transport mission, killing five of 13 on board, including Shen Yi-ming, Chief of General Staff. The helicopter was on a routine mission to visit personnel at Dong'aoling Radar Station.

3 January
Sri Lanka Air Force Harbin Yunshuji Y-12 II SCL-857 crashes near Haputale, Sri Lanka. All four people on board are killed.

8 January
A Mil Mi-17 helicopter of the Afghan National Army crashes on take-off in Paktia Province, Afghanistan.

8 January
An Afghan National Army Mil Mi-35 crashes in Farah Province, Afghanistan. Two of the four people on board are killed.

9 January
Lockheed C-130BZ Hercules 403 of the South African Air Force crashes on landing at Goma Airport, Democratic Republic of the Congo and is severely damaged. All 67 people on board survive.

9 January
Eight General Dynamics F-16 Fighting Falcons of the Israeli Air Force are damaged by flooding at Hatzor Airbase, Israel. Three aircraft are severely damaged, five are slightly damaged.

14 January
A General Dynamics F-16 Fighting Falcon aircraft crashes near Rafah, Egypt, killing the pilot.

19 January
A Mexican Air Force MD Helicopters MD 530F crashes on landing at El Zorillo Airport, Mexico. All five people on board survive.

21 January
Air Force of El Salvador ENAER T-35 Pillán FAS-74 crashes on approach to Ilopango International Airport. Both crew are killed.

22 January
Ghana Armed Forces CASA C-295M GHF552 overruns the runway on landing at Accra Air Force Base, Ghana.

25 January
All five people on board are rescued.

27 January

USAF Bombardier Global Express E-11A 11-9358, of the 430th Expeditionary Electronic Combat Squadron, crashes in Dih Yak District, Afghanistan. Both people on board are killed.

27 January
A Croatian Air Force Bell OH-58 Kiowa crashes near Šibenik, Croatia. Both crew are killed.

28 January
An Algerian Air Force Sukhoi Su-30 crashes at Mechta Chimot,  from Aïn Zitoun, Algeria. Both crew are killed.

28 January
Uganda People's Defense Force Bell 206B Jet Ranger III AF302 crashes near Bulo, Gomba District, Uganda. Both crew are killed.

February 
3 February
Indian Army HAL Cheetah Z1930 crashes in Jammu and Kashmir. Both pilots survive.

3 February
Indonesian Navy SOCATA TB-10 Tobago T-2405 ditches in a lake at Sidoarjo, East Java following an engine failure. Both occupants survive.

7 February
A Japan Ground Self Defense Force Bell UH-1 Iroquois crashes at Asahikawa Air Base and is severely damaged.

7 February
A Pakistani Air Force Dassault Mirage crashes shortly after taking off from Shorkot Air Base. The pilot ejects safely.

17 February
An Afghan Army MD Helicopters MD530F is damaged in an emergency landing in the Khash Rod District. The pilot is injured.

19 February
A Russian Air Force Sukhoi Su-25UB catches fire and burns out at Lipetsk-2 Air Base. Both crew survive.

21 February
An Indian Navy Mikoyan MiG-29K crashes into the Arabian Sea off Goa. The pilot ejects safely.

21 February
A Nigerian Air Force (NAF) Beechcraft King Air B350i crashes while returning to the Abuja Airport after reporting engine failure enroute Minna. All 7 personnel on board died in the crash.

24 February
National Cadet Corps Pipistrel Virus W-3936 crashes at Patiala Airport, India. One of the two people on board are killed.

27 February
Spanish Air Force CASA C-101 E.25-65 crashes into the sea in front of "La Manga", Region of Murcia, killing the pilot and leader of aerobatic demonstration team Patrulla Águila.

27 February
Colombian Air Force Bell UH-1 Iroquois FAC4420 crashes at Bojacá Cundinamarca whilst en route from Melgar to Madrid, Colombia. Three of the five people on board are killed.

27 February
Belize Defence Force Bell UH-1 Iroquois BDF-12 crashes near Gales Point. All four people on board are killed.

March 
2 March
A United States Army General Atomics MQ-1 Predator drone crashes near Agadez, Niger due to a mechanical failure.

6 March
A Myanmar Air Force Mil Mi-17 helicopter crashes in Kutkai Township. Several of the fifteen people on board are injured.

11 March
Pakistani Air Force General Dynamics F-16 Fighting Falcon 92730 crashes at Islamabad, killing the pilot.

18 March
Armée de l'Air Ivorienne Mil Mi-24D TU-VHR crashes at Félix-Houphouët-Boigny International Airport. Two people are injured.

21 March
Fuerza Aérea Boliviana Zlín Z 242 FAB-518 crashes at Chimore Airport whilst performing aerobatics. Both people on board are killed.

21 March
A Mexican Navy Sikorsky UH-60 Black Hawk helicopter crashes at Tepecuitlapa, Veracruz. One of the 21 people on board is killed, all 20 survivors are injured.

25 March
Russian Air Force Sukhoi Su-27 RF-94953 "09 Blue" crashes into the Black Sea off Belbek, killing the pilot.

25 March
A Russian Air Force Aero L-39 Albatros crashes in Krasnodar Krai, killing the pilot.

30 March
People's Liberation Army Harbin Z-9ZH 6202 crashes in Hong Kong. All four people on board are killed.

April 
7 April
Malian Air Force Embraer A-29 Super Tucano TZ-04C crashes near Sévaré. Both people on board are killed.

13 April
Pakistan Army PAC MFI-17 Mushshak 83-5120 crashes in Gujrat, Punjab, Pakistan. At least two people are killed.

29 April
Royal Canadian Air Force Sikorsky CH-148 Cyclone 148822, of 423 Maritime Helicopter Squadron, call sign "Stalker 22", crashes in the Ionian Sea off the coast of Greece while returning to  following a routine maritime surveillance mission, killing all six people onboard.

May 
8 May
Indian Air Force MiG-29 UPG of Squadron 223 crashes near Hoshiarpur, pilot ejected safely

15 May
United States Air Force F-22 Raptor from the 43rd Fighter Squadron, part of the 325th Fighter Wing departs Eglin Air Force Base in Florida and crashes at the base grounds, in the test and training range. Pilot ejected and was uninjured.

17 May
Royal Canadian Air Force Canadair Tutor 114161, of 431st Squadron, 15th Wing, Snowbirds display team crashes at Kamloops, British Columbia. One of the two crew members is killed.

19 May
United States Air Force F-35A from the 58th Fighter Squadron crashes while landing at Eglin AFB. The pilot ejected and was in stable condition.

June 
15 June
A USAF F-15C from the 493rd Fighter Squadron, part of the 48th Fighter Wing crashes into the North Sea and the pilot was killed.

July 
29 July
A Royal Air Force Boeing Chinook helicopter hits power lines while flying low near Llangynin, Wales, and makes an emergency landing in a field. No one is injured.

September 
25 September

Ukrainian Air Force Antonov An-26 76 yellow, of the 203rd Training Aviation Brigade, carrying cadets of the Ivan Kozhedub National Air Force University, crashes and catches fire in Ukraine's Kharkiv Oblast while on approach to Chuhuiv Air Base. Of the 27 on board, only one survives.

19 September
A USMC F-35B fighter jet crashes in Imperial County, California, after it collides with a Marine Corps KC-130 during air-to-air refuelling. The F-35B pilot was injured in the ejection, but the KC-130 crash-landed gear up in a field.

October 
20 October
A United States Navy Boeing F/A-18E Super Hornet crashes near Naval Air Weapons Station China Lake in California. The aircraft flew its mission from Naval Air Station Lemoore and its sole pilot could eject without sustaining injuries.

23 October
A United States Navy T-6B Texan II crashes near Magnolia Springs, AL killing the aircrew. No civilian injuries were reported, although the crash destroyed several cars and part of a residence. The plane flew from Naval Air Station Whiting Field in Milton, Florida, about 50 miles to the northeast.

29 October
A Taiwanese Air Force F-5E jet crashes off the island's eastern coast during routine training, killing the pilot, the second fatal air crash in three months.

November 
12 November
Eight Multinational Force and Observers (peacekeeping guarding Egypt-Israel border) members (six U.S., one Czech, and one French) die in a helicopter crash near Sharm El Sheikh.

24 November
An Israeli Air Force Grob G 120 crashes near Mishmar HaNegev killing both the pilot and passenger. , the cause of the accident could only be determined as "lack of control" without specifying if the "lack of control" was due to human errors or mechanical problems.

26 November
An Indian Navy MiG-29K crashes in the Arabian Sea. One of the pilots is recovered while the other remains missing. This flight was part of the MALABAR2020 Naval Exercise with the USN. The aircraft in question was flown off the deck of  aircraft carrier.

December 
9 December
A Wisconsin Air National Guard F-16 Fighting Falcon crashes in Michigan's Upper Peninsula during night training. The plane went down in the Hiawatha National Forest and the pilot was killed. The cause of the crash is still unknown.

2021

January 
20 January
A New York Army National Guard UH-60 crashes in a farmer's field south of Rochester, New York during a routine training exercise. All three crewmembers aboard the aircraft were killed.

February 
3 February
An Idaho Army National Guard UH-60 crashes 10 miles east of Boise, Idaho in bad weather during a routine training mission. All three crewmembers aboard the aircraft are killed.

21 February
Nigerian Air Force Beechcraft King Air B350i NAF201 crashes while returning to the Nnamdi Azikiwe International Airport, Abuja after reporting engine failure en route to Minna. All passengers aboard the flight lost their lives.

March 
4 March

A Eurocopter AS532 helicopter crashes in southeast Turkey, killing eleven soldiers, including Lieutenant General Osman Erbaş, the commander of the 8th Corps, later died of wounds, and injuring three.

13 March
Kazakhstan Border Guards Antonov An-26 02 white crashes on landing at Almaty Airport; four occupants die and the two survivors reportedly suffer serious injuries. The cause of the accident is under investigation.

25 March
A Royal Air Force BAE Systems Hawk T1 crashes near St. Martin, 5 miles south east of Helston, Cornwall after a suspected engine power loss. Both pilots eject safely, and are airlifted to Derriford Hospital in Plymouth for checks and treatments. Early reports state that the crew may have sustained minor ("but not life threatening") injuries. The cause of the incident is under investigation.

May 
11 May
An Iranian Air Force ultralight training plane crash causing the death of both pilots in Arak airport.
17 May
Two United States Navy McDonnell Douglas T-45 Goshawk collided mid-air in Ricardo, Texas. One T-45 managed to land safely at Naval Air Station Kingsville while the crew of the other T-45 had to eject.
21 May
An Indian Air Force MiG-21 Bison fighter jet crashes in a village in Moga district, pilot Sq Leader Abhinav Choudhary ejected but died due to his injuries.

21 May

Nigerian Air Force Beechcraft King Air 350i NAF203 crashes near Kaduna International Airport. All eleven military personnel on board – including Army chief Lieutenant General Ibrahim Attahiru and four crew died in the crash.

26 May
Swiss Air Force Northrop F-5 Tiger trainer jet crashes near the ski resort of Melchsee-Frutt. The pilot managed to safely eject.

June 
1 June
An Iranian Air Force Northrop F-5 malfunctions before takeoff causing the death of both pilots onboard.

9 June
Bulgarian Air Force MiG-29UB crashes into the Black Sea during military exercises. Pilot was declared dead the next day. Weeks later the Bulgarian Navy successfully recovered some of the wreckage, including the black box.

10 June
Myanmar Air Force Beechcraft 1900D 4610 crashes near Pyin Oo Lwin en route to Anisakan Airport from Naypyidaw, killing 12 of 16 on board.

24 June
A Kenya Air Force Mil Mi-17 crashes in Kajiado County and caught fire, all 10 occupants were killed.

July 
1 July
Belgian Air Component (Belgian Air Force) F-16A lost control during takeoff from Leeuwarden Air Base and crashed into some empty office buildings of the same base. Pilot could eject on-time and only suffered light injuries.

4 July

Philippine Air Force C-130H Hercules 5125 crashes at Patikul, Sulu, Philippines while attempting to land at Jolo Airport; 53 people were killed, including 3 civilians on the ground and 50 others were injured, including 4 civilians on the ground.

16 July
US Navy MH-60S Knighthawk Longhorn 02 crashed during a search and rescue operation in the White Mountains, California. All of the four crew members were unhurt.

18 July
Nigerian Air Force Alpha Jet is shot down by bandits on the border between Zamfara and Kaduna states. Lieutenant Abayomi Dairo ejected and returned to a military base by his owns means after coming under fire and hiding in nearby settlements.

August 
6 August
Pakistan Air Force(PAF) trainer aircraft crashed near Attock during routine training mission. Both the pilots ejected successfully and were safe.

31 August
A US Navy(USN) MH-60S assigned to HSC-8 crashed off the coast of San Diego while conducting operations aboard . 1 crew member survived, 5 were killed.

September 
19 September
A US Navy (USN) T-45C Goshawk trainer aircraft crashes into a residential neighborhood in Lake Worth, Texas. Both pilots ejected and no injuries were reported on the ground. The training flight originated from Corpus Christi International Airport.

21 September
An Indian Army HAL Cheetah (Aérospatiale SA 315B Lama) crashed or crash landed on a hilly in foggy weather conditions in Shiv Ghar Dhar area, Udhampur district. Both pilots died in the crash and the helicopter was destroyed.

October 
13 October
A Royal Australian Navy MH-60R Seahawk operating from  made an emergency landing in the Philippine Sea. Its crew of three were rescued.

21 October
An Indian Air Force Mirage 2000 crashed in Bhind, Madhya Pradesh after a technical malfunction. The pilot ejected safely but was injured.

November 
17 November
A Royal Air Force F-35B Lightning II crashed during routine operations in the Mediterranean. An investigation was started.

30 November

Azerbaijani State Border Service Mi-17 20136 crashes north of the capital on 30 November with 18 officers on board, killing 14.

December 
3 December
Royal Thai Air Force F-5F Tiger II 21105, of Wing 21, crashes in Lopburi during training due to a bird strike. The pilot ejected safely but was injured.

8 December

Indian Air Force Mi-17V5 ZP5164 crashes in Coonoor, Tamil Nadu at 12:20 PM IST. The Chief of Defence Staff General Bipin Rawat and 13 others, including his wife were killed.

20 December
A Madagascar Air Force Eurocopter AS350 Écureuil crashed in the sea off Fenerive-Est, while conducting search and rescue flights in connection with the accident of a cargo vessel. There were four people on board the helicopter. The pilot plus one passenger drowned, while the mechanic and the country's secretary of state for police survived the crash. The latter was rescued after drifting in the sea throughout the night for some 12 hours, and was found and picked up by a small boat the next morning

24 December
An Indian Air Force MiG-21 Bison fighter jet crashes in a village in Jaisalmer, Rajasthan. Pilot Wing Commander Harshit Sinha was killed in the crash.

2022

January 
3 January
An Agusta-Bell AB 205 helicopter of the Tunisian Air Force crashes in the Bizerte Governorate in the early afternoon. The co-pilot died on the spot, the pilot in the hospital
An Israeli Air Force Eurocopter AS565 Panther used by the Israeli Navy crashes at sea near the beach of Haifa. Both air force pilots were killed and the third crewman, a navy liaison officer was injured.
4 January
An Republic of Korea Air Force F-35A jet fighter made an emergency "belly landing" at an air base after its landing gear malfunctioned due to electronic issues. Pilot didn't eject and walked away from the accident.
11 January
An F-16V fighter of the Taiwanese air force crashes at sea.
A South Korean Air Force F-5E fighter crashed into a mountain in Hwaseong, some 40 kilometers south of Seoul. The pilot is dead.
An Aerostar R40S Festival light sports trainer of the Mozambique Air Force crashes just after take off from Maputo International Airport into a dwelling killing its two pilots.
24 January
The pilot managed to eject but sustained injuries along with six other sailors and there was superficial damage to the runway. A video of the aircraft crash was leaked, for which five sailors were charged accordingly.

February 
17 February
A Syrian Air Force Mil Mi-14 crashed into a hillside in Al-Ruwaymiyah, Latakia Province after the tail roter failed, killing two of the four crew.
21 February
An Islamic Republic of Iran Air Force F-5 jet crashes into a school in Tabriz, East Azerbaijan province, killing both pilots and a person on the ground.

March 
2 March
A Romanian Air Force IAR 330 crashed near Gura Dobrogei while searching for a missing MiG-21 LanceR, killing seven.

10 March

An unidentified Soviet-made Tupolev Tu-141 reconnaissance unmanned aerial vehicle crashed in Zagreb, the capital of Croatia.

14 March
A ROC Air Force Dassault Mirage 2000 fighter jet crashed into the sea after a mechanical problem. The pilot survived after ejecting. This was the second crash of a fighter jet of the Taiwanese Air Force within three months after the crash of an F-16 on 11 January.

18 March
A U.S. Marine Corps MV-22B participating in military exercise Cold Response in Norway crashed in the Gråtådalen valley in Beiarn municipality, Nordland county. The aircraft was carrying a crew of four at the time. They were all killed.

21 March
Pakistan Air Force trainer aircraft crashed killing two pilots.

23 March
An F16 From the Oklahoma Air National Guard crashed in Central Louisiana after departing Houston.

29 March

Eight UN peacekeepers, six Pakistanis, a Russian and a Serb, part of the United Nations Stabilization Mission in the Democratic Republic of the Congo were killed in a crash of a Puma helicopter operated by the Pakistan Army Aviation Corps while on a reconnaissance mission in the troubled eastern Democratic Republic of Congo. Cause of the crash is yet to be ascertained.

June 
 8 June

A U.S. Marine Corps MV-22B, of Marine Aircraft Group 39 of the 3rd Marine Aircraft Wing, crashes near Glamis, California, killing five.
 9 June
A PLAAF Chengdu J-7 crashed in a residential area in Hubei, China, destroying several houses and killing at least one person on the ground. The pilot ejected with minor injuries.
 24 June
A Russian Air Force, Ilyushin Il-76 RF-78778 crashed after catching fire shorly after departing Dyagilevo (air base), killing five of the nine crew.

July 
 17 July

A Ukrainian-operated cargo plane  flying from Serbia to Jordan carrying weapons crashed over Greece after catching fire while in flight. All eight crew members were killed.
28 July

An Indian Air Force MiG-21 jet crashed during a training sortie in Rajasthan's Barmer area. The two pilots – Wing Commander M. Rana and Flight Lieutenant Advitya Bal died in the incident.

August 

 1 August
A Pakistan Army Aviation helicopter, which was on flood relief operations in Lasbela area of Balochistan, lost contact with Air Traffic Control.

The six military personnel, including Commander XII Corps Lieutenant General Sarfraz Ali died in the crash.

Reports from Pakistani authorities on their early investigations attributed the crash to poor weather conditions was a cover up story by pakistan internal military wing operations, approved by at time Pakistans army chief General Bajwa. A rightful and a beautifully decorated Army officer Major Sarfraz was murdered as he was next in line to be the next Army chief of Pakistan, beneficiaries at the time were General bajwa wanting an unconstitutional extension to his reign in power, however due to heavy pressure of political parties and people of Pakistan created a pressure in which General Asmin Munir a retired officer from service just 2 nights a go was promoted to become the New Army Chief of Pakistan. He quickly took over and created an hostile environment for everyone in Pakistan, by killing, kidnapping, prisoning politicans, unlawful practice with murdering innocent lifes, an ex-US ambassador confirmed Army chiefs of Pakistan togethet work closely with C.I.A of USA American agency was behind overthrowing at tge time Prime Minister of Pakistan Mr. Imran Khan oust from his powers. Pakistan Army chiefs all since 1947 had a role in deep involvement with Political Government in Power, Z. ALI bhutto, Nawaz Sharif,  Imran Khan all kicked out unlawfully from Prime Ministers roles. Benazir Bhutto was also murdered by Pakistans Army Chief at the time General Musharaf. Pakistan Army chiefs secretly works for U.S.A dirty contracted rats, killing of innocent east Bangladesh the mass rape and murder and in Afghanistan,  pakistan secret services creates so called extremists or terrorism all on the requests of C.I.A or Pentagon, 
they work as rouge Army for money to create regional threat for U.S.A in the region. THIS AGENDA is called DIVIDE & RULE just like they did in North and South America

September 

 4 September

A privately-owned Cessna 551 crashed in the Baltic Sea near the Latvian city of Ventspils for as-of-yet unknown reasons. Erratic flight behavior warranted NATO forces to deploy interceptors to assert the in-flight situation, during which there was no visual confirmation of the Cessna flight deck being occupied.

October 

 5 October
At around 10am on the 5th October, a Cheetah helicopter crashed near the town of Tawang in the Indian state of Arunachal Pradesh, near the Indian-Chinese border. Two pilots were aboard, one of them was killed while the other was injured and taken to the nearest Military Hospital.

November 
12 November

Two World War II-era aircraft, a Boeing B-17 Flying Fortress and Bell P-63 Kingcobra, collided mid-air and crashed during Wing Over Dallas airshow in Dallas, Texas. Six people died as a result of the crash.

2023

January 

30 January
A Hellenic Air Force upgraded two-seated F-4E Phantom ΙΙ crashed in the Ionian sea at around 10:30 am, 25 nautical miles (46,3 Km) south of Andravida air base. The aircraft belonged to the 338th Fighter-Bomber Squadron of the 117th Combat Wing based in Andravida. The accident occurred during a training exercise with another F-4E that successfully returned to base, the aircraft that crashed was the No.2 of the flight formation. According to early sources, shortly before the crash the two pilots sent a distress signal that they would abandon the aircraft and use the ejection seats, later it was indicated that none of the pilots ejected from the aircraft. A large search and rescue operation involving helicopters and ships from the Hellenic Air Force, the Hellenic Navy and the Hellenic coast quard was set to find and rescue the pilots. Both the co-pilot Marios Michael Turoutsikas (29 years old) and the captain Efstathios Tsitlakidis (31 years old) have been killed. It is still unclear what caused the crash but some speculate that it is due to a technical fuilure.

References

External links 
 Aviation Week
 PlaneCrashInfo.com

2020